Nazarul Fahmi (born 13 November 1996) is an Indonesian professional footballer who plays as a midfielder.

Early career
In 2011, from his hometown, he went to London to training in the Arsenal Academy who coached by Arsène Wenger. After that, his career dimmed again. When coming back from the Arsenal Academy in 2011, his career is not as bright as it is today. In 2012, he played for Bireun United, Persip Pasee (Aceh), Villa 2000, Persita Tangerang, until in 2015, he joined PS Barito Putera.

Club career

Barito Putera
Joined Barito Putera youth team in 2015, he was included to join the senior squad of Barito Putera in 2017. In the 2017 President's cup, Jacksen F. Tiago gave him the confidence of playing as a right wing on his team. And in the group phase of the President Cup against Bali United, he scored the opening goal in the 33rd minute in a match that was played at the Kapten I Wayan Dipta Stadium.

Persiraja Banda Aceh
In 2020, he signed for newly promoted club Persiraja to play in Liga 1. This season was suspended on 27 March 2020 due to the COVID-19 pandemic. The season was abandoned and was declared void on 20 January 2021.

Club statistics

References

External links
 Nazarul Fahmi at Soccerway
 Nazarul Fahmi at Liga Indonesia

Living people
1996 births
Indonesian footballers
Sportspeople from Aceh
Association football midfielders
Persiraja Banda Aceh players